The Jeep Trailhawk is a mid-size concept SUV unveiled at the 2007 North American International Auto Show.

The name Trailhawk was later used as a badge on other models in the Jeep lineup to designate a certain trim package.

External links

Jeep Trailhawk Gallery

Trailhawk
Mid-size sport utility vehicles
All-wheel-drive vehicles
Front-wheel-drive vehicles